() is a Japanese technology conglomerate based in Tokyo, founded by Hiroshi Mikitani in 1997. Centered around the online retail marketplace Rakuten Ichiba, its businesses include financial services utilizing Fintech, digital content and communications services such as the messaging app Viber, e-book distributor Kobo, and Japan's fourth mobile carrier Rakuten Mobile. Rakuten has more than 28,000 employees worldwide, operating in 30 countries and regions, and its revenues totalling US $12.8 billion as of 2021. Rakuten was the official sponsor of the Spanish football club FC Barcelona from 2017 until 2021, and the Golden State Warriors of the NBA as of 2022. It is often referred to as the "Amazon of Japan".

Some past significant investments include Buy.com (now Rakuten.com in the US), Priceminister (France, now Rakuten.fr), Ikeda, Tradoria, Play.com, Wuaki.tv, Pinterest, Ebates, Viki, The Grommet. The company also holds and has held stakes in Ozon.ru, AHA Life, Lyft, Cabify, Careem, Carousell and Acorns.

Businesses 
Rakuten, Inc. has more than 70 services operating via the three segments: Internet Services, FinTech, and Mobile.

The services constitute the Internet Services segment are as follows:
 E-commerce
Rakuten Ichiba
Rakuten.co.uk
Rakuten.fr
Messaging app
Viber
Food delivery
Rakuten Delivery 
Travel booking
Voyagin
 Online cash-back
Rakuten Rewards (formerly Ebates)
 Internet portal and digital content sites
Kobo Inc.
OverDrive, Inc.
Rakuten DX (formerly Aquafadas)
Rakuten TV
Viki
 Marketing and data analysis
Rakuten Advertising
 Online Survey
 Rakuten insight
The FinTech segment operates the following businesses:
 Banking and securities
 Credit cards
 Life insurance
 Digital wallet
The services operating under the Mobile segment are:
 Telecommunications network & sale of mobile devices
Rakuten Mobile

History

Early years (1997–1999)

Rakuten was founded as MDM, Inc. by Hiroshi Mikitani on 7 February 1997. The online shopping marketplace  was officially launched on May 1, 1997. The company had six employees and the website had 13 merchants.

The name was changed to Rakuten in June 1999. The Japanese word "rakuten" (楽天) means "optimism".

Harvard-educated former banker Mikitani envisioned the site as an online shopping mall, offering the opposite of what the larger companies like IBM were trying to do with similar services, by offering empowerment to merchants rather than trying to tightly control the virtual storefront. The service was offered for a smaller fee than the larger Internet malls were charging, and merchants were given more control, such as the ability to customize their storefronts on the site.

2000s
The company went public through an IPO on the JASDAQ market on April 19, 2000. At the time, the online marketplace had 2,300 stores and 95 million page views per month, making it one of the most popular sites in Japan.

In March 2001, the online hotel reservation service Rakuten Travel was launched.

In April 2002, a new system was introduced for merchants, combining monthly fixed fees with commissions on sales. That November, the Rakuten Super Point Program, a membership loyalty program, was introduced.

In September 2004, Rakuten grew its financial services businesses by acquiring consumer finance company Aozora Card Co., Ltd., later renaming it Rakuten Card Co., Ltd. The company began offering a Rakuten credit card in 2005. 
By November 2016, the Rakuten card was held by over 13 million people, and nearly 40% of Rakuten's revenue was from financial services, as it was operating Japan's largest Internet bank and third-largest credit company. Rakuten card holders are a part of a point-based membership program, and can use those points to make purchases on the Internet mall.
In 2016, the company introduced Rakuten Pay, an app-based smartphone payment system.

In October 2004, Rakuten Baseball was created, and the baseball team Tohoku Rakuten Golden Eagles was formed and joined Nippon Professional Baseball.

In 2005, Rakuten started expanding outside Japan, mainly through acquisitions and joint ventures.

In December 2005, Rakuten established the Rakuten Institute of Technology in Tokyo as its department in charge of research and development.

In a joint venture in February 2008, Rakuten and President Chain Store established Rakuten's first e-commerce site outside of Japan with Rakuten Ichiba Taiwan.

2010s
Around 2011, Rakuten started heavily expanding outside of Japan, with prominent moves including a stake in Canadian e-book maker Kobo Inc. and an investment in Pinterest.

In 2011, Rakuten launched Indonesia's Rakuten Belanja Online.

By late 2012, Rakuten had moved into online retail in Austria, Canada, Spain, Taiwan and Thailand and into the online travel markets in France—with Voyager Moins Cher.com—and China, Hong Kong, Korea and Taiwan—with its Tokyo-based international Rakuten Travel platform. In North America, Rakuten Golf made booking tee time online possible. To increase its global competitiveness, and to better incorporate non-Japanese speakers, Rakuten decided to adopt English as the company's official language starting in 2012. By 2016, nearly 40% of the company's engineers in Japan were non-Japanese.

In September 2014, Rakuten bought Ebates for $1 billion to enter online shopping membership rewards in Canada, China, Russia, South Korea, and the United States.

In January 2015, Rakuten entered the sport of football by acquiring Vissel Kobe, a top J-League team formed in 1995.

In March 2015, Rakuten announced that it would begin accepting bitcoin across its global marketplaces, shortly after investing in San Francisco–based bitcoin payments-processing startup Bitnet Technologies. Rakuten has been a strong supporter of bitcoin's potential, and was one of the first major companies to accept bitcoin for payment.

In 2016, Rakuten shut down retailing websites in the UK, Spain, Austria, Singapore, Indonesia and Malaysia. In that year, the company lost its long status as the largest e-commerce site in Japan to Amazon Japan.

On November 16, 2016, Rakuten announced it had agreed to a four-year partnership with the La Liga football club FC Barcelona, one of the most successful football teams in Europe. The agreement would see Rakuten become FC Barcelona's main global partner beginning with the 2017-18 season, with its name appearing on match-day jerseys. The deal was worth at least €220 million and includes an option for a one-year extension.

In February 2017, Ebates and Rakuten acquired Shopstyle and its influencer marketing group, Collective, to extend into fashion curation and discovery and product search.

Rakuten partnered with California-based Blackstorm Labs to launch an online social gaming platform called R Games in April 2017, going live with 15 free games optimized for smartphones, including Pac-Man and Space Invaders. The games are based on HTML5, which can be played across any device and on any platform, and Rakuten will tap into its worldwide database of 114 million online shoppers. Rakuten plans to integrate R Games into its messaging app Viber.

In September 2017, Rakuten signed a three-year, $60 million deal to become the official sponsor for the jersey patch on the front of the uniforms for the Golden State Warriors of the NBA.

Rakuten partnered with Walmart for a late push on e-books in January 2018. The company announced plans to launch its own cryptocurrency in March. In May 2018, Rakuten announced the fourth wireless mobile network of Japan, named Rakuten Mobile.

In June 2018 Ebates and Rakuten acquired Curbside to accelerate its online-to-offline offering to members and merchants.

In September 2019, negotiations successfully closed to acquire Chinese baseball team, the Lamigo Monkeys. With the sale, Rakuten became the first foreign company to own a Chinese Professional Baseball League team. Terms of the deal were not disclosed. The team name was formally changed to the Rakuten Monkeys on 17 December 2019. New uniforms, similar in design to those of the Tohoku Rakuten Golden Eagles were released.

2020s

In July 2020, Rakuten announced that it would be closing its online shop/marketplace in the United States, which formerly went under the name Buy.com. The marketplace closed to new orders on 15 September, and shut down after all remaining orders have been fulfilled.

In September 2020, Rakuten launched its wireless carrier service's 5G network in some areas of Japan after it started 4G services in April. The company named its network technology the Rakuten Communications Platform (RCP) which makes use of cloud computing to lower the price and started sales activity abroad, gaining at least fifteen international customers by the spring of 2021.

On September 24, 2020, Rakuten announced that they would shut down their online marketplace in Germany. As of October 15, 2020, they no longer accept new orders while all orders prior to that date were to be fulfilled.

In March 2021, Rakuten announced at a joint press conference attended by CEO Mikitani and the President of Japan Post Holdings that Rakuten would allot more than 8 percent stake to Japan Post Holdings for 150 billion yen, accepting Japan Post Holdings as the third-largest shareholder after the Mikitani family in the first-ever major capital tie-up for Rakuten, to be financially equipped to spend billions on installing telecommunications infrastructure across Japan in competition with rival Amazon Japan. Tencent and Walmart, the previous owner of Seiyu Group, now partially-owned by Rakuten, also took stakes of 3.65% and 0.9% respectively.

In February 2022, Rakuten founder Hiroshi Mikitani donated ¥1 billion ($8.7 million) to humanitarian actions in Ukraine amid 2022 Russian invasion of Ukraine.

Acquisitions and investment

In September 2002, the company acquired MyTrip.net, which was merged with Rakuten Travel the following year.

In 2005, Rakuten bought New York City-based LinkShare, later rebranded as Rakuten Marketing then as Rakuten Advertising, offering performance-based online sales and marketing programs. The acquisition spearheaded Rakuten's new global focus.

In October 2005, Rakuten bought a 15% stake in Tokyo Broadcasting System, raising its stake in the broadcaster to 19%. Rakuten later withdrew its bid and sold its shareholding back to Tokyo Broadcasting.

In 2010, Rakuten bought French online retailer PriceMinister for €200 million and US-based Buy.com for US$250 million. The group had been a significant shareholder in Ctrip, a Chinese travel site until it sold its stake in the company in August 2007 and, in 2010, it announced a joint venture with Baidu in China (Lekutian).

In June 2011, Rakuten acquired Brazilian e-commerce firm Ikeda — since renamed Rakuten Brazil. In July, it bought German e-commerce start-up Tradoria and rebranded it Rakuten Deutschland, and in September UK online retailer and e-commerce marketplace Play.com for £25 million (almost $41 million), which was converted into the points-based loyalty program Rakuten.co.uk.

In September 2011, Rakuten took a minority equity stake in Russian online retailer Ozon.ru, dubbed "Russia's Amazon", which had reported 2010 sales worth US$137 million. A four-company-strong consortium, led by the Japanese group, invested US$100 million. Rakuten's stake was not revealed. Rakuten announced an agreement to buy Canadian e-book reader company Kobo from Indigo Books and Music, operated by Heather Reisman (founder, Chair and CEO), in November, with the deal finalized in January 2012. The price was said to be US$315 million.

In July 2012, Rakuten led a $100 million investment in Pinterest, at a $1.5 billion valuation. Its partners were existing investors Andreessen Horowitz, Bessemer Venture Partners, and FirstMark Capital, and a number of investment “angels”. That investment marked the start of a drive to expand Pinterest's presence in Japan and Rakuten's 17 other global markets.

On 13 June 2012, Rakuten bought Wuaki.tv, a Spanish video on demand (VOD) service/company that is one of the largest in Europe and the market leader in Spain; as of July 2017, it has 5 million users across 12 markets in Europe. The purchase opened new opportunities, directly challenging Amazon, Netflix and others for domination of the VOD market, starting in Europe. In July 2017, wuaki.tv was rebranded to Rakuten TV. In November 2012, Rakuten bought French online retail delivery company Alpha Direct Services, to increase speed and quality of delivery.

On 10 October 2012, Rakuten acquired French electronic publishing company Aquafadas via its Kobo subsidiary to strengthen its position in rich media categories. In November 2020, the subsidiary was rebranded as Rakuten DX.

In May 2013, Rakuten acquired a majority share in "citizen commerce" site Daily Grommet, since rebranded as The Grommet. In June 2013, Rakuten announced its acquisition of U.S.-based logistics and services company Webgistix, specializing in fulfillment technology for e-commerce retailers. The acquisition was Rakuten's second logistics investment outside Japan and enables prompt fulfillment in the U.S.

In September 2013, Rakuten acquired Singapore-based video streaming site Viki. In November 2013, Rakuten led a US$800,000 seed round of funding for Singapore-based consumer-to-consumer marketplace app Carousell.

On February 13, 2014, Rakuten announced the acquisition of Tel Aviv-based web messaging company Viber Media for $905 million, to link up messaging with e-commerce. The Viber app is for making phone calls and sending free messages.

On May 29, 2014, Rakuten Marketing acquired DC Storm, a UK-based technology company which specializes in marketing attribution modeling and data-driven marketing.

In August 2014, Rakuten announced its purchase of Slice, a US company that provides online shopping services and sells business intelligence based on digital commerce measurement, for an undisclosed sum.

In September 2014, it was revealed that Rakuten would acquire US rebate site operator Ebates Inc. for approximately US$952 million to give the company more access to US consumers and help it grow abroad, as it takes on rivals such as Amazon.com and Alibaba. Ebates offers coupons and cash rebates to customers who shop at its more than 1,700 partner retailers.

In March 2015, Rakuten announced the acquisition of OverDrive, Inc., a wholesale distributor of e-books and other digital content that serves libraries and retailers, based in Cleveland, Ohio. The acquisition price was $410 million in cash. In 2019 private equity firm KKR announced it would be purchasing Overdrive from Rakuten. In June 2020 the acquisition was finalized.

In 2015, Rakuten relocated its corporate headquarters from Shinagawa to the Tamagawa neighbourhood of Setagaya-ku, to consolidate its Tokyo offices and to accommodate future growth.

Since 2015, Rakuten has invested in several ride-hailing services. In March 2015, Rakuten led a $530 million round of venture financing for Lyft, spending $300 million for a 12% stake in the company. In April 2016, Rakuten announced it would invest an additional $92 million in Cabify, which was founded in 2012 in Spain and is one of the largest ride-hailing services in Latin America. Rakuten previously invested $3 million in Cabify in 2015. Rakuten led a $500 million Series E round of funding in Middle Eastern transportation startup Careem, which closed out in June 2017.

In April 2016, Rakuten participated in a $30 million round of financing for investing app Acorns.

In August 2016, Rakuten confirmed that it had acquired the assets of bitcoin wallet startup Bitnet, with the assets to be used to create a research facility, Rakuten Blockchain Lab, based in Belfast that will explore the potential of the blockchain.

In April 2017, Rakuten invested US$2.4 million in Singapore-based MetroResidences, which allows homeowners to rent their properties out to companies and corporate tenants.

In January 2018, the Group purchased Asahi Fire and Marine from Japanese bank Nomura for an estimated 45 billion yen. This will be the first foray for Rakuten into the general insurance market, and Asahi will become a wholly owned subsidiary. The company provides fire, automotive and accident insurance to consumer and corporate clients.

In June 2018, Rakuten purchased Palo Alto based retail pickup startup, Curbside Inc. In October 2018, CafeX Communications announced that Rakuten Communications Corp., the telecommunications company within Japan-based Rakuten Group, has launched 'Connect Live', a cloud service powered by CafeX that enables business users to collaborate more easily in web browsers and mobile devices. Employees, customers and online visitors can simply click a link in a web browser to connect without needing to download new software or step through a sign-in process. Attendees can also join from mobile devices too.

In December 2019, Rakuten was reportedly selling OverDrive to private equity investment firm KKR. The price of the sale was not disclosed, though Rakuten said it would recognize about $365.6 million in profit from the sale in the first quarter of 2020. OverDrive's purchase from Rakuten was engineered by KKR’s Richard Sarnoff, a one-time executive at Random House who also was president of Bertelsmann Digital Media Investments until leaving for KKR in 2011.

In February 2020, Rakuten Marketing was rebranded as Rakuten Advertising. That month, Rakuten also sold its US$1.4 billion worth of stakes in various tech companies, including its entire shares in Pinterest.

In November 2020, Rakuten teamed up with KKR to acquire 85% of Seiyu, the Japanese nationwide retail chain owned by Walmart.

Sponsorship
 Vissel Kobe
 Golden State Warriors
Davis Cup
Football Club of Barcelona

Corporate Culture 
In 2010 the founder and CEO, Hiroshi Mikitani, mandated that all business, from official meetings to internal emails, be written in English. Corporate officers that do not become proficient in English in two years were to be fired. At the time, only an estimated 10% of the Japanese staff could function in English, with the mandate facing criticism from other CEOs at the time.

Rakuten introduced the English-only policy, dubbed "Englishnization," as part of Mr Mikitani's push to "globalize" the company and its employees.

The new policy resulted in the resignation of some staff. Eventually, Rakuten decided to provide free English classes, offered time to study, and made clear that learning English was a part of employees' job. In light of Japan ranking 14th globally with "moderate proficiency" in the global English Proficiency Index behind South Korea and ahead of Portugal it also introduced difficulty in hiring staff with both Japanese and English skills.

While claiming it a success in 2012  it was not until 2015 that the average employee score on the Test of English for International Communication, or TOEIC, had reached 802.6 out of a possible 990 points. A score above 800 indicates advanced proficiency.  

TOEIC does face criticism, though, concerning its validity.  

An example of official meetings held in English is "Asakai". It is a morning company-wide meeting that started on Saturdays  but is now on Monday mornings at 8:00 am (JST).

Criticism 
In March 2014, the UK-based Environmental Investigation Agency (EIA) named the company as the world's biggest online retailer of whale meat and elephant ivory, calling on the company to stop selling the items. As a result of this, in April 2014, Rakuten announced that it was ending all online sales of whale and dolphin meat by the end of the month. In July 2017, Rakuten announced that it was also banning ivory sales on its sites.

Recent recognition/awards
Best Operator 5G Innovation 
Ground-breaking Virtualization Initiative 
Forbes Top 100 Digital Companies 2019
Forbes Top Regarded Companies 2019 
Linkedin Best companies to work for in Japan 2019 
Forbes World’s Most Innovative Companies 2017

See also
 Japan Open Tennis Championships
 Rakuten Monkeys
 Tohoku Rakuten Golden Eagles
 Vissel Kobe
 Yukihiro Matsumoto

References

External links
 
 Official Japanese website

 
Japanese companies established in 1997
2000 initial public offerings
Companies listed on the Tokyo Stock Exchange
Internet properties established in 1997
Japanese brands
Multinational companies headquartered in Japan
Retail companies based in Tokyo
Retail companies established in 1997
Internet technology companies of Japan